Hugo Mattheüs de Jonge (born 26 September 1977) is a Dutch politician serving as Minister of Housing and Spatial Planning since 2022 in the Fourth Rutte cabinet. A member of the Christian Democratic Appeal (CDA), he was elected to its leadership in 2020 for the 2021 Dutch general election. He withdrew later that year, citing an impossibility to combine his position as Health Minister in charge of the COVID-19 pandemic efforts with his party leadership.

Early life and career 
De Jonge studied at the Ichthus Hogeschool in Rotterdam to become a teacher in primary education and then continued in Zwolle a study for school management, which he completed with a diploma "school leader primary education".

De Jonge worked in education for five years, first as a schoolteacher and eventually as deputy director of a primary school. 

De Jonge moved to national policy by working as a policy assistant for the CDA group in the House of Representatives in 2004. Between 2006 and 2010 he worked at the Ministry of Education, Culture and Science as political assistant of the CDA Minister Maria van der Hoeven and State Secretary Marja van Bijsterveldt and as a policy assistant with a focus on quality improvement of the secondary education.

Political career

Alderman 
In 2010, De Jonge was appointed as alderman with the portfolio of Education, Youth and Family in Rotterdam. As such, he argued in 2013 on national television for the closing of the Islamic school association Ibn Ghaldoun after a number of problems came to light.

After the municipal elections of 2014, De Jonge was appointed again as alderman, with the Healthcare portfolio. The same year he was announced as the Politician of the Year in Rotterdam. In October 2016, he announced a programme to persuade parents that are considered vulnerable to consider voluntary birth control. As he left the Rotterdam politics in October 2017, he was awarded the municipal Wolfert van Borselenpenning.

Minister 
In October 2017, De Jonge was appointed as Deputy Prime Minister and Minister of Health, Welfare and Sport in the Third Rutte cabinet. During the administration of the oath and installation of the new Ministers, De Jonge received media attention because of his unusual choice of shoes, receiving both criticism and praise.

After the resignation of Bruno Bruins as Minister for Medical Care on 19 March 2020, De Jonge became responsible for the government's response to the COVID-19 pandemic. In this capacity, he initiated the development of a COVID-19 app.

On 18 June 2020, De Jonge announced his candidacy for the leadership of the Christian Democratic Appeal, which had been vacant since the resignation of Sybrand van Haersma Buma in May 2019. In the vote, he won against Pieter Omtzigt.

Political positions
In his candidacy for the CDA leadership, De Jonge expressed his commitment to the political centre, seeing the CDA as a "broad people's party". He is seen as economically less on the right wing of his party than previous leaders, having previously called for the market and competition in healthcare to be restrained. He has also expressed the belief that his party should not cooperate with the right-wing populist parties Party for Freedom and Forum for Democracy.

References

External links

 
 CDA biography (in Dutch)

1977 births
Living people
Aldermen of Rotterdam
Christian Democratic Appeal politicians
Dutch political consultants
Dutch political writers
Leaders of the Christian Democratic Appeal
Ministers of Health of the Netherlands
Municipal councillors of Rotterdam
People from Schouwen-Duiveland
Protestant Church Christians from the Netherlands
20th-century Dutch civil servants
20th-century Dutch educators
21st-century Dutch civil servants
21st-century Dutch educators
21st-century Dutch male writers
21st-century Dutch politicians